Țăranu is a Romanian surname that may refer to
Anatol Țăranu (born 1951), Moldovan politician
Cătălin Țăranu (born 1973), Romanian go player
Ion Țăranu (born 1938), Romanian wrestler
Vladimir Țaranu (born 1982), Moldovan football player

See also
Endoclita taranu, a species of moth

Romanian-language surnames